The Petronas Philharmonic Hall is Malaysia's first concert hall built specifically for classical music. It is the home of the Malaysian Philharmonic Orchestra (MPO), and has hosted many of the world's leading orchestras such as New York Philharmonic, Philadelphia Orchestra, BBC Symphony and Vienna Symphony.

The concert hall was designed by Cesar Pelli based on the inspiration from the traditional shoebox shape of the 19th century European classical music halls. It has the capacity to accommodate for 920 seats which includes box seats, corporate suites and a royal suite. The stage floor is designed for flexibility, has an approximate area of 297m2, and can be extended to 369m2. The orchestra pit was designed to accommodate up to 45 musicians but can accommodate more with the existing stage extension.

History

Official construction of the hall began on 1 January 1995 as part of the base floor of Petronas Twin Towers. The construction completed a year later on the same date in 1996 while further renovations were done until 1997.

The concert hall was officially opened to public on 17 August 1998 by the patron of Malaysian Philharmonic Orchestra, Tun Dr. Siti Hasmah Mohamad Ali and her husband, who is also the Prime Minister of Malaysia, Tun Dr. Mahathir Mohamad.

The hall has hosted some of the world's leading orchestras under renowned artists, including the New York Philharmonic, Philadelphia Orchestra, Singapore Symphony Orchestra, Vienna Symphony, Budapest Festival Orchestra, with artists such as Lorin Maazel, Lang Lang, Christoph Eschenbach, Janine Jansen and many more.

Acoustic design
The hall is constructed with concealed movable ceiling panels which can be adjusted to alter the volume in the hall and simulate a wide range
of acoustic environments. There are seven movable panels in the upper ceiling. In addition, special acoustically absorptive panels in the sidewalls can be opened or closed to adjust the resonance of the hall. This incorporate unique elements into the hall design in order to maximize the natural acoustic quality of the wood interior. The acoustical technique was designed by Kirkegaard Associates.

Klais pipe organ
It was designed and built by Johannes Klais Orgelbau GmbH based in Bonn. An organ façade was inspired based on angklung, a traditional Malay music instrument. The pipe organ adds further dimension to the musical sounds presented in the concert hall with 2,977 pipes ranging from 32 feet tall to the shortest at just over an inch. The inaugural performance of the pipe organ was held on 17 August 1998 by Simon Preston during the official opening of the hall.

Pipes specification

Sound and recording systems
Petronas Philharmonic Hall is equipped with audio support and broadcast facilities, designed by Abbey Road Studios for recording, editing, broadcasting and monitoring performances in the concert hall. It aims to produce commercial quality recordings for selected performances.

See also
 Malaysian Philharmonic Orchestra
 Malaysian Philharmonic Youth Orchestra
 List of concert hall in Malaysia

References

External links

 Official website
 Malaysian Philharmonic Orchestra official website
 Petronas Philharmonic Hall project description

Buildings and structures in Kuala Lumpur
Concert halls in Malaysia
Petronas
Tourist attractions in Kuala Lumpur
1998 establishments in Malaysia